Iris maracandica is a species in the genus Iris, it is also in the subgenus Scorpiris. It is a bulbous perennial from Uzbekistan, Central Asia. It has short stems, scented spring flowers in shades of yellow.

Description

Iris maracandica is similar in form to Iris bucharica. It has bulb (approx.) 2 cm in diameter, with thickened fusiform roots (spindle-like).

It has falcate shaped leaves, that are 1.5 – 2 cm wide close to the base of the plant. The leaves have a silver edge.

It has 1-4 strongly scented flowers per stem, which bloom between March and April.

The flowers come in a range of shades of yellow, from pale yellow, to soft yellow, and rich-yellow. The perianth tube generally is about 3 – 4.5 cm long.
It has falls that have a wide wing and a raised pale yellow crest, the standards are short and deflexed.

It has whitish anthers and pollen.

Taxonomy
It was originally published as Juno maracandica by Alexei Vvedenski in 'Sched. Herb. Fl. As. Med. ' No. 662 in 1935. It was then published in 'Fl. Tadzhikskoi 'SSR 2: on page 393 in 1963.

It is named after 'Maracanda' (the Greek name for the city of Samarkand), in Tajikistan.

It was then published as Iris maracandica in 'Botaniska Notiser' Vol 128(2) page 216 in 1975 by Wendlbo.

Iris maracandica is now an accepted name by the RHS.

Native
Iris maracandica is found on the gravelly slopes in foothills of Central Asia. Found on the Pamir Mountains, and Nuratau Mountains of Uzbekistan.

It can be found near Dzhizak (now Jizzakh), Samarkand and Akrabat (in Uzbekistan).

Cultivation
It can be cultivated outside in well-drained soils, not needing the protection of a bulb frame or alpine house, in the UK.

References

External links
Image of Iris maracandica

maracandica
Plants described in 1935
Flora of Central Asia
Flora of Uzbekistan